Metastevia is a genus of flowering plants in the tribe Eupatorieae within the family Asteraceae.

Species
There is only one known species, Metastevia hintonii, native to central Mexico (Guerrero and México State).

References

Eupatorieae
Monotypic Asteraceae genera
Endemic flora of Mexico